Anak Verhoeven (born 15 July 1996) is a Belgian sport climber. Since 2013, she has repeatedly won the Belgian National Championship in lead climbing. In 2016, she ranked first on the IFSC World Ranking List. In 2017, she won both the World Games and IFSC Climbing European Championships.  Verhoeven is also one of the strongest female sport climbers, and in 2017, became the first-ever woman in history to establish a new  route, Sweet Neuf.

Early life
Verhoeven was born in Belgium and started to climb when she was 4 years old, and both her parents were already climbers.

Climbing career

Competition climbing

In 2012, at age 16, she started participating in the Lead Climbing World Cup, and by 2014, had become the Junior European Champion at the Championships in Edinburgh. In 2015, she won the World Youth Championship in Italy, where she competed for the last time as a junior.  In the same year, she also participated in the Lead Climbing World Cup, where she ranked fourth.

In 2016, she competed at the World Championships in Paris. During the finals, she managed to top the route but fellow competitor Janja Garnbret also topped and won gold due to countback. In the same year, she also ranked second in the Lead Climbing World Cup. Verhoeven ended the 2016 competition season as number 1 on the IFSC World Ranking List.  In 2017, she won both the World Games and IFSC Climbing European Championships.

In late 2017, Verhoeven was forced to take time off from competition climbing with a serious elbow injury from which she did not fully recover until 2019.  In June 2021, Verhoeven announced that she was retiring from competition climbing to focus on her outdoor rock climbing projects.

Rock climbing

In September 2017, she did the first free ascent (FFA) of the  route Sang neuf, at Pierrot Beach in France, becoming the first-ever woman in history to do an FFA at that grade. Her ascent of Sweef Neuf made her the second-ever woman in history to climb a 9a+ route (Margo Hayes was first), and the first-ever woman in history to do the FFA of a 9a+ route. 

In December 2017, Verhoven did the FFA of the 9a/9a+ route Ciudad de Dios pa la Enmienda in Spain, making her the first-ever female to do an FFA of a 9a, a 9a/+ or a 9a+ route (Angela Eiter did the first-ever female FFA of a 9b route). In November 2019, she climbed her second 9a+, Joe Mama, in Spain. In June 2020, Verhoeven made the FFA of Kraftio, a route that was bolted 15 earlier but had repelled all attempts to scale it; Verhoven graded it 8c+/9a making it Belgium's hardest-ever sport climbing route, which she named in memory of the former Belgian climber Chloé Graftiaux.

Personal life
Christian faith is an important part of Verhoeven's life, which she said she inherited from her parents.

Rankings

Climbing World Cup

Climbing World Championships 
Youth

Adult

Climbing European Championships 
Youth

Adult

Number of medals in the Climbing European Youth Cup

Lead

Number of medals in the Climbing World Cup

Lead

Notable ascents

Redpointed routes 

:
 No Pain No Gain – Rodellar, Spain – 25 October 2022. First female ascent.
 Joe Mam a – Oliana, Spain – 7 November 2019. First female ascent.
 Sweet Neuf – Pierrot Beach, France – 11 September 2017 – First free ascent, and first-ever woman in history to create a new  route.

:
 Patxitxulo, in Oliana, Spain – 9 October 2021. First female ascent.
 Ciudad de Dios pa la Enmienda – Santa Linya, Spain – 10 December 2017. First free ascent and first-ever creation of a new 9a/9a+ route by a female in history.

:
 Esclatamasters – Perles, Spain – January 2022 – Verhoeven climbed the route twice on the same day.
 Joe Cita – Oliana, Spain – December, 2021.
 La prophétie des grenouilles – Rocher des Brumes, France – July, 2021.
 Sang Neuf – Pierrot Beach, France – 4 September 2017 – FFA, and first-ever creation of a new 9a route by a female in history.
 Era Vella – Margalef, Spain – April, 2015. Verhoeven's first 9a.

:
 Kraftio, Belgium – 4 June 2020 – First ascent and Belgium's hardest climbing route at the time; named in memory of Chloé Graftiaux.

See also

 List of first ascents (sport climbing)
 Muriel Sarkany, Belgian female rock climber
 Josune Bereziartu, Spanish female rock climber

References

External links 
 
 

 Belclimb.be profile
 
 
VIDEO:Anak Verhoeven's Journey Of Life, Family And Faith, PlanetMountain La Sportiva Living Legends Series (November 2022}

Female climbers
Belgian rock climbers
1996 births
Living people
World Games gold medalists
Competitors at the 2017 World Games
IFSC Climbing World Cup overall medalists